Eric John Weightman (4 May 1910 – January 2002) was an English professional footballer who played in the Football League for Chesterfield and Middlesbrough as a left half.

Career statistics

Honours 
Chesterfield

 Mansfield Charity Cup: 1936–37
 Chesterfield Senior Cup: 1937–38
 Chesterfield Hospital Cup: 1938–39

References 

English Football League players
English footballers
Clapton Orient F.C. wartime guest players
Association football wing halves
Footballers from York
1910 births
2002 deaths
Scarborough F.C. players
Middlesbrough F.C. players
Chesterfield F.C. players
Notts County F.C. players
Watford F.C. wartime guest players
Charlton Athletic F.C. wartime guest players